Gaddy is a Scottish surname.

Background
It is possibly first used by people of the Kingdom of Strathclyde along the Anglo-Scottish border. It is a name for someone who lived in Midlothian. It is possible that it evolved from the name Goldie, which derives from the Old English personal name Gold. Alternative spellings are Geddy, Gaddie, Goudie, Gouday, Goudey, Goudy, Gowdy, Gowdie, Gadie, Goodie, Gady. It is also possible that it derives from Geddes or Clan Ged. Another possibility is that it is derived from the Old English gedda, a nickname meaning pike.

Notable people
Notable people with the surname or close variants include:
 Abdul Gaddy (born 1992), American basketball player
 Anthony Gadie (1868–1948), English businessman and politician
 Bea Gaddy (1933–2001), American humanitarian
 Bob Gaddy (1924–1997) American pianist, singer and songwriter 
 Charlie Gaddy (born 1931), anchorman
 Daniel Abraham Gaddie (1836–1911), African-American Baptist preacher
 John Gaddy (1914–1966), American basketball player
 Rikki Gaddie (born 1971), South African former tennis player

References